The 2016 European Junior Judo Championships is an edition of the European Junior Judo Championships, organised by the European Judo Union.It was held in Málaga, Spain from 16 to 18 September 2016. The final day of competition featured team events, with team Georgia winning the men's event and team Germany the women's.

Medal summary

Medal table

Men's events

Women's events

Source Results

References

External links
 

 U21
European Junior Judo Championships
European Championships, U21
Judo competitions in Spain
Judo
Judo, World Championships U21